WU, W.U. or wu (as an abbreviation) may stand for:

Universities
 University of Warsaw, Poland
 Washburn University, Kansas, US
 Washington University in St. Louis, Missouri, US
 Waynesburg University, Pennsylvania, US
 Webster University, Missouri, US
 Willamette University, Oregon, US
 Winthrop University, South Carolina, US
 WU Wien Wirtschaftsuniversität Wien  (Vienna University of Economics and Business), Austria
 The World University, Arizona, US

Other uses
 Weather Underground, a radical group active in the 1970s in the US
 Weather Underground (weather service)
 Western Union (alliance), a European alliance existing created in 1948
 Western Union, an American financial services and communications company
 Windows Update, a service which updates software on computers running Microsoft operating systems
 Women Unite, a vocal and percussion group consisting of eight South African women
 Work unit, a name given to a place of employment in the People's Republic of China
 Worms United, in the Worms series of artillery strategy computer games
 Power Jets WU, a series of experimental jet engines tested in the 1930s

See also
 Wu (disambiguation)
 UW (disambiguation) 
 Uwu (disambiguation)